Priority Matrix is a time management software application that is supported on a number of platforms, including Microsoft Windows, Mac OS X, Android, and iOS. It is based on the Eisenhower Method of arranging tasks by urgency and importance in a 2x2 matrix. Priority Matrix offers a cloud-based synchronization of data, allowing for data management across multiple devices. The application is also loosely based on David Allen's Getting Things Done methodology of improving productivity.

Features
 Quadrants-based task prioritization – The 2x2 time management matrix, based on the Eisenhower Method of time management, is the general framework on which Priority Matrix is run. The quadrants organize tasks based on importance and urgency. In Priority Matrix, the four quadrants' default labels are: Critical and Immediate, Critical but not Immediate, Not Critical but Immediate, and Uncategorized.
 Task drag and drop – Tasks and projects are capable of being dragged from one location to another, allowing users to change a task's priority level without having to create a new item altogether.
 Project import/export – Entire projects can be exported into the program's native file format, .pmatrix, for transferring a workspace quickly.
 Cloud-based synchronization across platforms – Despite running on several different platforms, Priority Matrix is able to sync project and task data over the cloud, with data being stored on Priority Matrix's servers.
 Progress and date tracking – Dates and deadlines can be made for each task, providing notifications and allowing users to track their progress over time.
 Project summary emails and reporting – Emails can be created out of entire projects, for quick reporting and sending a summary of projects.
 Color and label customization – Each quadrant's background can be changed to any color in the RGB spectrum. For further customization, every task has icons that can be selected to represent a specific task.
 Template system – New projects can be created from sample templates, to avoid repetitive data input. Various templates are available for different thought processes.

Reception
Across the various platforms, Priority Matrix has over 90,000 paid customers, and has been ranked among the 10 highest downloaded productivity apps in the Apple App Store. PC Magazine has ranked the iPad version of Priority Matrix among its 100 Best iPad Apps in 2011, 2012, and 2013. In addition, the product has garnered a 4 out of 5-star rating or better on the Apple App Store on both the iPhone and iPad platforms, with over 1,300 reviews. An Android version was added to the Play Store September 2013. As of 2014, this version had an average rating of 3.9, with 1,000–5,000 installs.

References

External links
 Appfluence official website
 WWDC Interview Appfluence

Cloud storage
IOS software
Classic Mac OS software
Windows software
Proprietary cross-platform software
Task management software
Business software for macOS
Business software for Windows